This list contains the names of albums that contain a hidden track and also information on how to find them. Not all printings of an album contain the same track arrangements, so some copies of a particular album may not have the hidden track(s) listed below. Some of these tracks may be hidden in the pregap, and some hidden simply as a track following the listed tracks. The list is ordered by artist name using the surname where appropriate.

 The W's:
 Fourth From the Last: A tribute to Five Iron Frenzy performed in the style of Wesley Willis, following track 12, "Hui."
 Trouble with X: Some versions of the CD have a cover of "The Rumor Weed Song" from children's cartoon VeggieTales as track 15, with a hidden reprise of "Play the Game" following it, featuring someone singing along to the song, apparently unaware that they are being recorded.
 Tom Waits:
 Real Gone: unlisted track 16 "Chick a boom" featuring Tom beatboxing after a lengthy silence at the end of track 15
 Orphans: Brawlers, Bawlers, and Bastards: The final two tracks of Disc 3 (the "Bastards" disc) are unlisted. One is a live recording of Waits telling a Los Angeles audience about an unorthodox type of dog treat; the other is Waits - alone this time, with a distorted voice - telling a long-winded story about a woman at a supermarket who told him he reminded her of her son.
 The Wallflowers, (Breach) and Red Letter Days
 Butch Walker, Letters: 30 seconds after the final track "Thank-You Note" ends, is the hidden track "State Line."
 Joe Walsh:
 Joe Walsh's Greatest Hits - Little Did He Know...: An excerpt of "I Don't Have the Time" by The James Gang, recorded from vinyl, appears at the end of the album
 But Seriously Folks: A few seconds after "Life's Been Good," there is a track called "A Flock of Waa-Waa's." This was later found at the end of Disc One on Selected Works: 1972–1999
 The Waterboys, Fisherman's Blues: The 59-second thirteenth track, "This Land Is Your Land," is unlisted on the artwork and on the Disc.
 Warrant, Dirty Rotten Filthy Stinking Rich: During the fade-out of "D.R.F.S.R." is an incomprehensible message rather famous for the different interpretations fans have given it.
 Simon Webbe: Sanctuary (2004): "Pusherman" (Press rewind when the first track "Lay Your Hands" starts and the song should rewind back through to the song)
 The Wedding, Polarity: A comical patriotic anthem to the band's home state, Arkansas, at the end of "Fireworks" at 8:11, after a long period of silence; a lengthy session of "Southside" outtakes hidden in pregap.
 Ween:
The Mollusk: After the last track "She Wanted to Leave", there's 24 seconds of silence followed by a reprise of the opening track "I'm Dancing in the Show Tonight."
 Weezer:
Van Weezer: After the last track "Precious Metal Girl" on the vinyl release of the album, an unlisted track "Thrown It All Away" plays. This is followed by another unlisted track, a reprise of an earlier song from the album, "I Need Some of That".
"Weird Al" Yankovic:
 Off The Deep End: After the last track, there's 10 minutes of silence, followed by a brief, loud snippet of unintelligible shouting and random instrumental noises, entitled "Bite Me". Since this album's cover and first track are parodies of Nirvana's Nevermind cover and first track "Smells Like Teen Spirit", this hidden track is a fitting tribute to the hidden track "Endless, Nameless" which is hidden in the same way on some pressings of Nevermind.
 Susan Werner:
Time Between Trains: The last track, "Vincent" is followed by 1:03 of silence and then the hidden track "Movie of My Life."
 Kanye West:
 Late Registration: The track "Late" is the last track and is hidden; it appears right after a listed bonus cut.
 808s and Heartbreak: An unlisted live freestyle in Singapore called "Pinocchio Story" appears as the 12th and final track on the album.
 Paul Westerberg: Stereo (2002): A rocking cover of Flesh For Lulu's 1980s hit "Postcards From Paradise" closes out the album.
 Westlife:
 Coast to Coast: "Don't Get Me Wrong" appears as track 30 after ten tracks of 5-second silence.
 World of Our Own: "Bad Girls" appears 6 minutes and 10 seconds after the final track, "Angel."
 Allow Us to Be Frank: "Beyond The Sea" appears as track 15 after track 14, which is 10 second silence.
 Wham!, Fantastic: Hidden track (approximately ten seconds after "Young Guns (Go for It!)")
 When: The Lobster Boys (2001): Untitled hidden track (Hidden in pregap: rewind before opening track, the track is nearly 13 minutes)
 White Cowbell Oklahoma: Casa Diablo (2006): Jarring "Turn Off Your Set" instrumental fades in after an over twenty-minute break from the last-listed song, "Time to Ride." Has musical connection to CD-opening instrumental, "Adjust Your Set."
 White Rose Movement, Kick (2006): "Luna Park" plays a few minutes after the last track "Cruella."
 White Zombie, Astro-Creep: 2000: "Where The Sidewalk Ends, The Bug Parade Begins" starts a few minutes after "Blood, Milk and Sky."
 The Whitlams, Eternal Nightcap (1997): The track "Band on Every Corner" is extended by 7:01 of silence, which then transitions to an untitled track of 8:55 duration. Included in the track is an unidentified man complaining about his vocals and Tim Freedman's use of the 'bullhorn' effect, recordings of conversations between Tim Freedman and his mother, and sections of Whitlams songs performed with altered lyrics.
 The Who, The Who Sell Out: At the end of the album is an infinite loop featuring voices repeating the words "Track Records" - The Who's record label - over and over.
 Whysall Lane, Whysall Lane (2006): "Little Moon" is hidden in the album's pregap
 Wilco, Summerteeth: After the last track, "In a Future Age," there is a track with 23 seconds of silence. Following this is "Candyfloss" and an alternate version of "A Shot in the Arm."
 David Wilcox: East Asheville Hardware: A humorous version of Eye of the Hurricane at the end of the last track after an interval of silence.
 Graheme Wilson: Soon: Before the title track there is an instrumental not listed on the CD or inlay cards. Press pause on track 1 and rewind to -4 minutes 9 seconds and then press play.
 Wild Colonials, Life As We Know It EP 1/4: After the last track, "A Message from Shark" and Instrumental versions of "Love®" and "Vicious Circle."
 The Wildhearts, P.H.U.Q.: After the last track, "Getting It," there is the song "Don't Worry 'Bout Me."
 Hank Williams III:
 Lovesick, Broke and Driftin': A few minutes of silence follow "Atlantic City" and then a radio announcer begins to talk and a reprise of "Walkin With Sorrow" begins.
 Straight to Hell: Disc 2 features a 40-minute hidden track medley, which is not mentioned on the back of the CD. The medley's prelude begins at the end of "Louisiana Stripes."
 Robbie Williams:
 Life thru a Lens (1997): "Hello Sir" follows after ten minutes of silence following the final track, "Baby Girl Window." "Hello Sir" features as a hidden track in the same fashion on the US compilation album, The Ego Has Landed.
 I've Been Expecting You (1998): "Stand Your Ground" and "Stalker's Day Off" appear after five minutes of silence following the final track, "These Dreams."
 Angels (1999): "Grace" (Video) and "Man Machine" (Video) appear if you win the multimedia game 'Spot the Joker'.
 Sing When You're Winning (2000): After the last track, "The Road to Mandalay," 25 minutes of silence play followed by Williams saying "No, I'm not doing one on this album," which is in reference to how his previous albums all contain hidden tracks. The Spanish version of the album includes a Spanish-language version of "Better Man" as a hidden track, and the French version features a French-language version of "Supreme."
 Swing When You're Winning (2001): "Beyond The Sea" (Reprise) and Album Outtakes follow the last track, "Beyond The Sea."
 Escapology (2002): "How Peculiar" (Reprise) and "I Tried Love" play after the last track, "Nan's Song."
 Intensive Care (2005): "King of Bloke & Bird" (Reprise) plays after the last track, "King of Bloke & Bird."
 Rudebox (2006): "Dickhead" plays shortly after the last track, "Summertime."
 And Through It All: Robbie Williams Live 1997–2006: "Kids" (Live From TOTP) will appear by accessing a secret function on the menu.
Wesley Willis: "Greatest Hits Volume 2": After about 30 seconds of silence at the end of the CD, outtakes of his songs are played, including one called Solid Snake. This is then followed by a clip from the track 'Interview' off of the Wesley Willis Fiasco's Live CD.
 Amy Winehouse:
 Back to Black: US release contains unlisted 11th track, a reprise of "You Know I'm No Good" featuring Ghostface Killah
 Frank: US release contain 2 unlisted tracks at the end of the album, "Brother" and "Mr. Magic".
 Winter, Eternal Frost: On some editions track 5 is unlisted on the back cover.
 Winterpills, The Light Divides (2007): The last track is a hidden track after the previous track is completely empty.
 Mac Wiseman: Rural Rhythm Presents The Best of Mac Wiseman: Essential Original Masters (2006): The hidden track is the 26th and last track on the CD, an instrumental version of "Wildwood Flower," a previously unreleased recording from a 1966 session for Rural Rhythm Records.
 Wolf Alice, My Love Is Cool (2015): At the end of the closing track "The Wonderwhy" there is a lengthy silence leading up to a short, minimalistic song featuring only an acoustic guitar and vocalist Ellie Rowsell's voice. This hidden track is often considered to be the album's title track.
 Wolfgun, Physics: "Daydreams" and "Connection", along with "early development clips" of "Ghosts" and "Hammer", are unlisted bonus tracks that come with the digital download of the album.
 Lee Ann Womack: Her 2005 album There's More Where That Came From features a hidden track called "Just Someone I Used To Know."
 The Wombats: On their debut album A Guide to Love, Loss and Desperation there's a version of the opening track (Tales of Girls, Boys and Marsupials) which is only played on Piano
 World Party, Bang!: The last track also contains 22 minutes of silence followed by Beach Boys pastiche "Kuwait City."
 Wintersleep: On their second, untitled album there's a hidden track if rewinded at the start.
 Erik Wollo: On his album Emotional Landscapes (released on Spotted Peccary Music in 2003), there is a hidden track at the very end of the disk. A long droning ambient track, slowly fades in after about 5 minutes of silence.
 The World Is a Beautiful Place & I Am No Longer Afraid to Die, Harmlessness (2015): The last track of the CD version of the album contains the iTunes bonus track "Make Mistakes" in addition to "Mount Hum".

See also
 List of backmasked messages
 List of albums with tracks hidden in the pregap

References 

W